Mishogawa Dam is a concrete gravity dam located in Yamaguchi prefecture in Japan. The dam is used for flood control. The catchment area of the dam is 21.3 km2. The dam impounds about 9  ha of land when full and can store 640 thousand cubic meters of water.

References

Dams in Yamaguchi Prefecture
1958 establishments in Japan